The 2008 United States Senate election in Nebraska was held on November 4, 2008. The primary elections was held on May 13. Incumbent Republican U.S. Senator Chuck Hagel decided to retire instead of seeking a third term. Republican Mike Johanns won the open seat.

Republican primary

Candidates 
 Pat Flynn, businessman
 Mike Johanns, former United States Secretary of Agriculture and former Governor of Nebraska

Withdrew
Jon Bruning, Attorney General of Nebraska 
Hal Daub, former mayor of Omaha and former United States congressman

Results

Democratic primary

Candidates 
 Scott Kleeb, businessman and candidate for NE-03 in 2006
 Tony Raimondo
 Larry Marvin
 James Bryan Wilson

Results

Green primary

Candidates 
 Steve Larrick

Results

Nebraska primary

Candidates 
 Kelly Renee Rosberg

Results

General election

Predictions

Polling

Results

By county 

From Secretary of State of Nebraska

See also 
 2008 United States Senate elections

References

External links 
 Elections from the Nebraska Secretary of State
 U.S. Congress candidates for Nebraska at Project Vote Smart
 Nebraska, U.S. Senate from CQ Politics
 Nebraska U.S. Senate from OurCampaigns.com
 Nebraska U.S. Senate race from 2008 Race Tracker
 Campaign contributions from OpenSecrets
 Johanns (R) vs Kleeb (D) graph of multiple polls from Pollster.com
 Official campaign websites (Archived)
 Mike Johanns, Republican nominee
 Scott Kleeb, Democratic nominee
 Steve Larrick, Green nominee

Nebraska
2008
2008 Nebraska elections